The Little World of Don Camillo is a 1952 Italian-French film directed by Julien Duvivier, starring Fernandel and Gino Cervi. It was the first film in the "Don Camillo" series, which made Fernandel an international star. The film was based on the novel Don Camillo by Italian author Giovannino Guareschi. It was followed in 1953 by The Return of Don Camillo, also directed by Duvivier.

Synopsis
The story starts in a small [albeit unnamed] town, simply known as "a small world", in the Po lowlands of northern Italy, in the early summer of 1946. The town's Communist party led by Peppone has just won the majority of seats within the city council, an event which they exploit for propagandistic purposes – and with some non-vocal, but church bell-assisted protest by the outraged Don Camillo, the spiritual leader of the town's Christian political party –, when an unexpected event puts an instant stop to this arising conflict: Peppone has just added a new member, a son, to his family, and following a personal and pugilistic appeal by Peppone himself (as well as some admonishment from Christ) to a reluctant Don Camillo, the child is baptized in Camillo's church. Similar conflicts arising in the course of the story are settled between Don Camillo and Peppone in a similarly conflicting, but ultimately unified fashion, such as:
the erection of a kindergarten for the town after Don Camillo finds out that Peppone has used money stolen from the fascists during World War II to finance the construction of his new community hall, and blackmails him with this knowledge;
a farmhand strike organized by the Communists to impose a special tax on the wealthier landowners in order to give the town's people work, resulting in the local cattle herds not getting milked until both Don Camillo and Peppone surreptitiously resolve the problem together; 
a river blessing procession and the funeral of the town's generally respected old teacher, Ms. Christina, which are both kept strictly non-political despite the Communists' initial intentions.

An important side story within the film is the Romeo and Juliet-esque relationship between a young girl named Gina Filotti, who has just returned to the town from boarding school as the story begins, and a young man named Mariolino Brusco. Gina and Mariolino's blossoming relationship, however, is off to a bad start: not only that the families of Gina (as Christians) and Mariolino (as Communists) are on ideologically opposite sides, they are also entertaining a long-running private feud. When their cause finds no support with neither Peppone as the mayor, nor with Camillo as a priest, the two lovers decide to commit a double suicide. Fortunately, both opposing parties come to their senses just in time, rescue the two and get the wedding underway. But during the combined wedding and house-warming festivities for the now-finished community hall and kindergarten, Don Camillo takes offense at one of Peppone's better throws at an Aunt Sally stall, which results in a public mass brawl.

Even though Peppone resents Don Camillo's interferences and their after-effects on personal health, he secretly enjoys their amicable quarrels and repeatedly tries his best to persuade the local bishop not to have Camillo replaced. However, with this last misdeed the bishop decides to send Camillo to a different community, and Peppone has threatened Camillo's parish not to say farewell to him as he is about to depart. But to his delightful surprise, Don Camillo does receive a touching goodbye from the people of his town – first from his parish at the train station next town, then from Peppone and his party comrades at the very next station afterward. Before Camillo departs for his new destination, Peppone asks him to come back soon and promises that Camillo's successor will not last long under his attention.

Cast
Fernandel as Don Camillo
Gino Cervi as Giuseppe 'Peppone' Bottazzi
Vera Talchi as Gina Filotti
Franco Interlenghi as Mariolino Brusco
Saro Urzì as Brusco
Charles Vissière as the Bishop
Leda Gloria as Signora Bottazzi
Luciano Manara as Filotti
Mario Siletti as Stiletti
Marco Tulli as Smilzo
Italo Clerici as the corrupt soccer referee
Sylvie as Christina
André Hildebrand as Barchini
Orson Welles as Narrator (voice, English version)
Jean Debucourt as voice of jesus

Production notes
Julien Duvivier was 55 when he filmed Le petit monde de Don Camillo in the Italian town of Brescello.

The film was produced by Francinex (Paris) and Rizzoli Amato (Rome). It belongs to a long series of Franco-Italian (or Italo-French) coproductions which provided hundreds of movies to the cinema during 30 years after World War II.
In Le Petit Monde de Don Camillo (released in Italy as simply Don Camillo) one of the characteristics is a certain balance between the two countries, since the original author, the place of action, and one of the two stars are Italian, while the director, the screenwriters, and the first star are French. The crew and the rest of the cast are also equally divided between both nations.

During filming, the actors spoke their own language. So there are two originals, one Italian, and one French, in which the actors of the other language are dubbed.

Reception
The film was the highest-grossing film in Italy of all-time and is currently the seventh most watched Italian film at the cinema with 13,215,653 admissions.

It was also the highest-grossing film in France of all-time and is currently the sixth most watched French film at the cinema with 12,791,168 admissions and the 17th most watched film in France.

Sequel
The film had four sequels, thus totaling five films plus one unfinished due to Fernandel's sudden death:

The Return of Don Camillo (Italian: Il ritorno di don Camillo ; French: Le Retour de don Camillo) (1953)
Don Camillo's Last Round (Italian: Don Camillo e l'onorevole Peppone; French: La Grande Bagarre) (1955)
Don Camillo: Monsignor (Italian: Don Camillo monsignore ma non troppo; French: Don Camillo Monseigneur) (1961)
Don Camillo in Moscow (Italian: Il compagno don Camillo; French: Don Camillo en Russie) (1965)
Don Camillo e i giovani d'oggi (French: Don Camillo et les contestataires; English translated: Don Camillo and the youth of today)  (1970) (unfinished film)

References

External links
 

1952 films
French comedy films
Italian comedy films
French satirical films
Italian satirical films
Italian black-and-white films
French black-and-white films
1950s Italian-language films
Films about Catholic priests
Films based on Italian novels
Films based on works by Giovannino Guareschi
Films set in Italy
Films set in Emilia-Romagna
Films with screenplays by René Barjavel
Italy in fiction
Cold War films
French multilingual films
Italian multilingual films
Films directed by Julien Duvivier
1950s multilingual films
French political satire films
Italian political satire films
Films critical of communism
Films scored by Alessandro Cicognini
1950s Italian films
1950s French films